Philip Saltzman (September 19, 1928 – August 14, 2009) was an American executive producer and television writer. Saltzman was best known for his work as the executive producer of the 1970s CBS detective series, Barnaby Jones.

Saltzman was born in Hermosillo, Mexico, on September 19, 1928, to Jewish parents who had immigrated from Russia. He moved as a child to Los Angeles, California, with his parents. Saltzman obtained both his bachelor's degree and master's degree in English from University of California, Los Angeles.

Saltzman began his career in the television industry during the 1950s as a writer for the Alcoa Theatre. He would later work as a scriptwriter for a number of other television series and films, including The Swiss Conspiracy, The Fugitive, The Third Man, Perry Mason, The Rifleman and Felony Squad.

Saltzman was best known for producing the 1970s show, Barnaby Jones. Additionally, he was also a producer for The F.B.I. and Columbo, as well as a 1975 television movie Attack on Terror: The FBI vs. the Ku Klux Klan.

Saltzman died in his sleep at the Motion Picture & Television Country House and Hospital in Woodland Hills, Los Angeles, California on August 14, 2009, at the age of 80. He was survived by his wife, Caroline, and three children, as well as four grandchildren.

Filmography

Films

Television

References

External links

1928 births
2009 deaths
American television writers
American male television writers
Television producers from California
University of California, Los Angeles alumni
American people of Russian-Jewish descent
Mexican emigrants to the United States
Mexican Jews
Mexican people of Russian-Jewish descent
People from Hermosillo
Businesspeople from Los Angeles
Columbo
Screenwriters from California
20th-century American screenwriters